Raphael W. Bostic (born June 5, 1966) is an American economist, academic, and public servant who has served as the 15th president and CEO of the Federal Reserve Bank of Atlanta since 2017. During his academic career, Bostic served as chair of the Department of Governance, Management, and the Policy Process at the Price School of Public Policy at the University of Southern California.

Early life 
Bostic was born to Rafael Theodore Bostic of St. Croix and Viola Williams in New York City and grew up in Delran Township, New Jersey, where he was valedictorian of Delran High School. He earned a Bachelor of Arts (BA) degree from Harvard University in 1987 with a combined major in economics and psychology. In 1995, he earned his doctorate in economics from Stanford University.

Career
Bostic served as a board member of Freddie Mac, the Lincoln Institute of Land Policy and Abode Communities. He is a fellow of the National Academy of Public Administration, vice president of the Association for Public Policy Analysis and Management, a member of the board of trustees of Enterprise Community Partners, and a research advisory board member of the Reinvestment Fund.

Bostic was an economist for the Federal Reserve Board of Governors from 1995 to 2001, and the assistant secretary for policy development and research at United States Department of Housing and Urban Development from 2009 to 2012. He was the Chair of the Department on Governance, Management and the Policy Process at the Sol Price School of Public Policy at the University of Southern California from 2012 to 2017.

In 2020, Bostic wrote an essay for the FRB Atlanta entitled, "A Moral and Economic Imperative to End Racism."  In it he wrote that systematic racism drags on the economy. 

On October 14, 2022, Bostic said he had improperly disclosed financial transactions covering his five years leading the bank after a federal investigation. Bostic stated a 3rd party manager had made the transactions, unknowingly to him.  Federal Reserve Chairman Jerome Powell has asked the Office of Inspector General for the Federal Reserve Board to initiate an independent review of President Bostic’s financial disclosures.

Political future 
Throughout his career, Bostic has been mentioned as a potential nominee for a variety of roles in the federal government. In November 2020, Bostic was named as a potential candidate for Secretary of the Treasury in the then-upcoming Biden Administration, a position that ultimately went to Janet Yellen. 

In August 2021, Bostic was mentioned as a contender for the position of Comptroller of the Currency.  He has recently been mentioned as a possible replacement for Jerome Powell as Chair of the Federal Reserve, before he was re-nominated for a second four-year term.

Personal life
Bostic is the first African-American and first openly gay person selected to lead a regional Federal Reserve bank.

See also
 Federal Reserve System
 Federal Reserve Bank of Atlanta

References

External links
 Federal Reserve System Biography

1966 births
Living people
20th-century American economists
21st-century American economists
Delran High School alumni
Federal Reserve Bank of Atlanta presidents
Gay men
Harvard College alumni
LGBT people from New Jersey
People from Delran Township, New Jersey
Stanford University alumni